The 2000 Gerry Weber Open was a men's tennis tournament played on grass courts at the Gerry Weber Stadion in Halle, North Rhine-Westphalia in Germany and was part of the International Series of the 2000 ATP Tour. It was the 8th edition of the tournament and was held from 12 June through 18 June 2000. Unseeded David Prinosil, who received a wildcard for the main draw, won the singles title.

Finals

Singles

 David Prinosil defeated  Richard Krajicek 6–3, 6–2
 It was Prinosil's only singles title of the year and the 3rd and last of his career.

Doubles

 Nicklas Kulti /  Mikael Tillström defeated  Mahesh Bhupathi /  David Prinosil 7–6(7–4), 7–6(7–4)

References

External links
 Official website 
 ATP tournament profile
 ITF tournament edition details

 
Gerry Weber Open
Halle Open
2000 in German tennis